The 1969 World Field Archery Championships were held in Valley Forge, Pennsylvania, United States. This was the inaugural World Field Championships and differed from normal target archery played at Olympic and Commonwealth level. Field archery involved different sized targets, distances and gradients on a field course.

Medal summary (Men's individual)

Medal summary (Women's individual)

Medal summary (team events)
No team event held at this championships.

References

E
1988 in American sports
International archery competitions hosted by the United States
World Field Archery Championships